IBES may refer to:
 Institute for a Broadband-Enabled Society, a research institute in Melbourne, Australia
 Institutional Brokers' Estimate System, a service founded by the New York brokerage firm Lynch, Jones & Ryan
 A plural of ibis